Bulgaria selected their Junior Eurovision Song Contest 2011 entry through the national selection "Konkurs za detska pesen na Evroviziya 2011". The winner was Ivan Ivanov with the song "Supergeroy". He represented Bulgaria in the contest where he placed 8th with 60 points.

Before Junior Eurovision

Konkurs za detska pesen na Evroviziya 2011 
Konkurs za detska pesen na Evroviziya 2011 was the national final format developed by BNT in order to select Bulgaria's entry for the Junior Eurovision Song Contest 2011. Both shows took place at the BNT studios in Sofia, hosted by Joanna and Kristian Talev.

Competing entries
Artists and songwriters were able to submit their entries from 16 August 2011 to 12 September 2011. BNT received 21 entries, and a seven-member jury panel selected fifteen songs for the competition. The jury panel consisted of:
 Boris Karadimchev – composer, founder of the famous children's vocal group "Pim-Pam"
 Haigashod Agasyan – composer
 Maya Raykova – music editor from the Bulgarian National Radio
 Angel Zaberski – musician, conductor, composer
 Vyara Panteleeva – pop singer
 Nikolai Dogramadjiev – actor, singer and television presenter
 Teodora Popova – director

Semi-final 
The semi-final took place on 17 September 2011. Fifteen songs competed and the top ten entries as determined by the jury panel advanced to the final.

Final
The final took place on 2 October 2011. Ten songs consisting of the ten semi-final winners competed and the winner was determined by a 50/50 combination of points awarded by SMS voting and the jury panel.

At Junior Eurovision

Voting
The voting during the final consisted of 50 percent public televoting and 50 percent from a jury deliberation. The jury consisted of five music industry professionals who were citizens of the country they represent. This jury was asked to judge each contestant based on: vocal capacity; the stage performance; the song's composition and originality; and the overall impression by the act. In addition, no member of a national jury could be related in any way to any of the competing acts in such a way that they cannot vote impartially and independently.

Below is a breakdown of points awarded to Bulgaria and awarded by Bulgaria in the final.

Notes

References

Bulgaria
2011
Junior Eurovision Song Contest